Bağcılar is a village in the District of Koçarlı, Aydın Province, Turkey. As of 2010, it had a population of 621 people.

References

Villages in Koçarlı District